In previous years, students in the United States who have been diagnosed to have intellectual disabilities (ID) cannot have access or have difficulty having access to post-secondary education (PSE). One significant reason why these students have been marginalized from continuing their education is their being denied federal student aid. Many were disqualified due to the lack of having a high school diploma while others were not able to pass standardized tests which should indicate if their claim to secure aid is justified. With the legislation of the Higher Education Opportunity Act of 2008, students with ID can now qualify for student grants and work-study programs.

In the past 20 years, PSE programs for students with ID have become prevalent throughout the United States (Plotner & Marshall, 2015). In 2010, the Office of Post-secondary Education provided financial support for the development of PSE programs through grants.

Although attaining any type of academic degree is not possible for many students with ID,  they do stand to benefit from participating in PSE programs. The benefits do not necessarily lead to traditional measures of academic achievement. Instead, students gain increased independence, self-determination, positive social experiences, self-advocacy, problem solving, self-monitoring and goal setting and time management skills. All of these skills help students be more independent, improve their psychological well-being and provide them stronger opportunities to find employment.

In a study conducted by Ross and colleagues, researchers compared employment and independent living outcomes of 125 graduates from the Taft College Transition to Independent Living (TIL) program designed for students with intellectual and developmental disabilities with outcomes from the general population of people with ID and developmental disabilities. The researchers found that 94% of TIL graduates lived by themselves, with their spouse or roommates in a home that they rented or owned compared to only 16% in the general population. Furthermore, the study found that 95% of graduates continue to socialize with fellow alumni through home visits, phone calls or email.

Employment

Students with ID have some of the worst employment outcomes of all disability populations (Grigal, Hart & Weir, 2013). In 2009, only 35% of young adults between the ages of 21 and 25 were employed. By contrast, during the same time period, the average employment rate was at 90.2% (Moore & Schelling, 2014). That same year, 40.3% of employees with ID earned less the federal minimum wage (Moore and Schelling, 2014). The combination of an increasing number of jobs requiring some type of education after high school and their history of exclusion from the higher education system have led to this conclusion. In the past, employment options for people with ID have been limited to supported employment  and sheltered workshops  (Foley et al., 2012).

Going to college is often connected with getting well paying jobs and higher employment rates. This premise applies to students with disabilities including those with ID (Butler, Sheppard-Jones, Whaley, Harrison & Osness, 2015). Students that attend a PSE program are more likely to find employment than those who only complete high school (Butler et al., 2015). Smith, Grigal & Sulewski (2012) investigated the American Community Survey (ACS). The ACS is a national survey conducted by the U.S. Census Bureau designed to understand changing communities. The researchers compare findings on people with disabilities, with cognitive disabilities and no disabilities. They found that 43% of people with cognitive disabilities and some college credit were employed compared to 31% who had only completed high school.

Additionally, students with ID who attend a PSE program are more likely to earn higher wages (Hart, Grigal & Weir, 2010). For example, Ross and colleagues (2012) found that 87% of TIL graduates who were employed earned at least the minimum wage. In one study, Moore and Schelling (2015) compare the employment outcomes of alumni from two PSE programs and a control group made up of people who never attended a program by surveying the participants. They found that students who attended a PSE program were employed at higher frequencies in office support at 58%, sales at 17% and teaching at 17%.

Inclusion

Efforts to make college a legitimate option and a reality for students with ID have been led by advocacy groups such as the DREAM Partnership and Think College (Grigal, Hart &Weir, 2013). Although the benefits of entering PSE are plentiful, only 37% of students with ID continue their education after high school (Hart et al., 2004). Once in college, even though students with disabilities participate in campus events and students life, they tend to feel as lonely as non-students (Butler et al., 2015). Still, progress has been made. For example, in K-12 education, students with disabilities are increasingly getting more integrated into mainstream classrooms and are succeeding with reasonable supports (Hart, Grigal & Weir, 2010).

Supports and accommodations

Several laws exist in the United States that assure individuals with disabilities receive reasonable accommodations in their school. For example, section 504 of the Rehabilitation Act of 1973 protects the rights of disabled people to participate in federally funded programs, services or benefits (Grigal, Hart & Weir, 2013). Under this act and the Americans with Disabilities Act, students may receive accommodations (Hart, Grigal & Weir, 2010). Accommodations may vary from college to college but usually include the assistance of a designated note taker, extended time for tests, taking tests at a designated quiet space, voice recorders for lectures and assistive technology computer software such as text-to-speech and speech recognition software (Grigal, Hart & Weir, 2013).

A common support is the use of peer mentors, coaches or ambassadors who assist students with understanding their assignments, finding campus resources and engaging in campus activities (Grigal, Hart & Weir, 2013).

Post-secondary education programs

There are two main paths for students with ID that are interested in continuing their education after high school. One path, known as the inclusive, individual support model (Hart et al., 2004; Plotner & Marshall, 2015), is to complete entrance examinations, applications and complete degree requirements with the use of accommodations (Hart, Grigal & Weir, 2015). The second path is to not matriculate but instead enter into PSE program designed for students with ID. In these programs, students may take credit or non credit courses, audit courses or take extended study courses (Hart, Grigal & Weir, 2010). The minimum requirements to be admitted into a PSE program are to read at a third grade minimum and not be considered able to attain a degree with support (Moore & Schelling, 2015).

Currently, there are over 220 PSE programs in the United States (Plotner & Marshall, 2015). While wide variation exists among programs, they do share several features. For example, they do not focus on academic access; the focus is on independent living skills and employment development (Grigal, Hart & Weir, 2013; Moore & Schelling, 2015). Programs usually collaborate with outside organizations such as local school districts, the department of rehabilitation and local non-profit community organizations (Grigal, Hart & Weir, 2013). In addition, programs use person centered planning to develop a structure that will help the student meet their goals.

PSE programs can be categorized into three types: the dual enrollment model, the substantively separate model and the mixed model. Close to a third of PSE programs in the United States follow the dual enrollment model (Plotner & Marshall, 2015). Programs with this model are funded through the Individuals with Disabilities Education Act of 2004. The act provides for special education transition services to students with ID up to the age of 21 to attend college (Hart, Grigal & Weir, 2010). In these programs, students attend high school and college courses simultaneously. The college courses may be restricted to non-credit, continuing education or to courses specifically designed for students with ID (Hart, Grigal & Weir, 2010).

Programs that follow the substantively separate approach hold student courses and social activities on campus yet the courses are restricted to their program (Plotmer & Marshall, 2015). These programs tend to serve larger student populations compared to the mixed programs (Hart et al., 2004). Moreover, students who participate in this type of programs usually have very little interaction with other students outside of the program (Hart et al., 2004). Mixed model programs attempts to include their students with the rest of the student body. Students are encouraged to be very active in campus activities and they take mostly inclusive courses while completing their program courses which focus on employment building skills (Plotner & Marshall, 2015).

References 

Intellectual disability
Higher education in the United States